Boris Loza (May 5, 1960) is the founder of SafePatrol Solutions and Tego Systems, as well as a Certified Information Systems Security Professional (CISSP). He was born in Krasnodar, Russia, where he attained a Master's degree at the age of 22 and a PhD at the age of 26, both in Computer Science and Cybernetics. While still living in the former USSR, Loza published more than 30 scientific articles, as well as secured one patent. Upon relocating to Canada in 1996, his PhD was confirmed by the Higher Attestation Committee of The University of Toronto.

Since immigrating, Loza has worked for IBM Global Services as a Senior System Administrator and for Fidelity Investments as a Principal Information Systems Security Specialist.

Loza's interest in computer security has led him to continue developing products as well as to publish articles and a book. His articles have been featured in hacker's magazines, such as the "original" Phrack and 2600: The Hacker Quarterly. He has contributed over 40 articles to US industry magazines, such as Usenix ;login:, SysAdmin, Inside Solaris, Inside the Internet, and several others.

Publications 

In 2005, Loza published a computer security book titled "UNIX, Solaris and Linux: A Practical Security Cookbook: Securing UNIX Operating Systems without Third-Party Application." A number of Loza's articles have been featured in the press, including Sun Microsystems, Novell, Linux, and BSD communities. His work, both in Russian and English, has been translated into several languages, including French, Bulgarian and Polish.

Loza holds "Secret Level" clearance from the Government of Canada, and acts as a subject matter expert in courts. He has filed several Information Security patents in the US, and has conducted hundreds of information security assessments, security forensics, penetration tests and white hacking assessments

Recognition 

As a speaker, author and trainer, Loza has worked for and consults Fortune and Global 500 companies, including IBM, AT&T and Fidelity Investments, as well as government agencies and start-ups. His work has been cited in books such as "Hack Proofing Sun Solaris 8", among others.

In 2008, Boris Loza was internationally recognized for his work and contribution to the field of Computer Security Awareness. He was a winner of the first international Cyber Security Awareness Contest, held by (ISC)².

Projects 

Some of the computer security products developed by Boris Loza, by himself as well as with co-authors, are:

 External, Internal and Mobile SafePatrol
 LozaLock
 Notebak Anti-Theft and Alarm
 Virtual Digital Label (DigitaLabel)
 TrackDrive

Loza's current project is Notebak—a computer security system used by both personal and corporate systems.

References 

1960 births
Living people
People associated with computer security